Araeomolis robusta is a moth of the family Erebidae. It was described by Hervé de Toulgoët in 1987. It is found in French Guiana.

References

Phaegopterina
Moths of South America
Moths described in 1987